Leonard Frederick McConnell (1 September 1907 – 23 October 1987) was an Australian rules footballer who played with North Melbourne in the Victorian Football League (VFL).

McConnell later served as an instructor of recruit in the Australian Army during World War II.

Notes

External links 

1907 births
1987 deaths
Australian rules footballers from Victoria (Australia)
North Melbourne Football Club players
Warrnambool Football Club players